Rah Hamvar (also Romanized as Rāh Hamvār) is a village in Mohajeran Rural District, Lalejin District, Bahar County, Hamadan Province, Iran. At the 2006 census, its population was 1,403, in 273 families.

References 

Populated places in Bahar County